Tingena sinuosa is a species of moth in the family Oecophoridae. It is endemic to New Zealand and has been observed in Wellington and at Tongariro. Adults of this species are on the wing in December.

Taxonomy
This species was first described by Alfred Philpott in 1928 using specimens collected at Wellington Botanic Garden and named Borkhausenia sinuosa. In 1939 George Hudson discussed this species under the name B. sinuosa. In 1988 J. S. Dugdale placed this species within the genus Tingena. The male holotype is held in the New Zealand Arthropod Collection.

Description 
Philpott described this species as follows:

Philpott stated that this species is extremely similar to T. enodis but that it can be distinguished as there are differences in the male genitalia of the two species.

Distribution
This species is endemic to New Zealand and has been observed in Wellington and at Tongariro.

Behaviour
The adults of this species are on the wing in December.

References

Oecophoridae
Moths of New Zealand
Moths described in 1928
Endemic fauna of New Zealand
Taxa named by Alfred Philpott
Endemic moths of New Zealand